The 2008–09 Auburn Tigers men's basketball team represented Auburn University in the 2008–09 college basketball season. The team's head coach was Jeff Lebo, who was in his fifth season at Auburn. The team played their home games at Beard–Eaves–Memorial Coliseum in Auburn, Alabama. They finished the season 24–12, 10–6 in SEC play. They defeated Florida to advance to the semifinals of the SEC tournament where they lost to Tennessee. They received an invitation to the National Invitation Tournament, where they defeated UT Martin and Tulsa to advance to the quarterfinals where they lost to  Baylor.

Schedule and results

|-
!colspan=9 style=| Exhibition

|-
!colspan=9 style=| Regular season

|-

|-
!colspan=9 style= | SEC tournament

|-
!colspan=9 style= | NIT

References

Auburn Tigers men's basketball seasons
Auburn
Auburn
Auburn
Auburn